Molly Sims (born May 25, 1973) is an American fashion model and actress. She has been featured in campaigns by a number of major brands, including Jimmy Choo, Escada, Giorgio Armani, Michael Kors, and Chanel. She was a frequent model in the Sports Illustrated swimsuit issue in the early 2000s, and walked the runway for the annual Victoria's Secret Fashion Show in 2001.

As an actress, she portrayed Delinda Deline in NBC's comedy-drama series Las Vegas (2003–2008), and the "right Missy" in The Wrong Missy.

Early life and education
Molly Sims was born on May 25, 1973, to Jim and Dottie Sims. As a child she lived in Mayfield, Kentucky, then moved to Murray, Kentucky, so that her father could continue working for his book company located in Murray, Kentucky. She has an older brother, Todd. She is of German descent on her mother's side and English and Cherokee on her father's side. Following her graduation from Murray High School in 1991, Sims enrolled in Vanderbilt University to study political science. In 1993, when Sims was 19 years old, she dropped out to pursue a career in modeling. At Vanderbilt, she was a member of Delta Delta Delta.

Career

Modeling 
After sending her photos to a few modeling agencies, Sims got signed to Next Models Management in New York City.

She was featured on the cover of Vogue Spain's April 1997 issue and Vogue Paris' September 1999 issue. In 2001, Sims became an official spokesmodel for Old Navy, appearing in advertisements known for using the tag line "You gotta get this look!" Sims walked the runway for the annual Victoria's Secret Fashion Show in 2001 and the following year she landed a multiyear contract with CoverGirl. She has also appeared on the runway for Veronique Leroy, Jerome L'Huillier, Givenchy, Ann Demeulemeester, and Emanuel Ungaro. She has graced the cover of numerous fashion magazines, including Ocean Drive, Lucky, Marie Claire, Elle, Cosmopolitan, Allure, Glamour, Shape, Self, and Vanidades.

She appeared in the Sports Illustrated swimsuit issue in 2000, 2001, 2002, 2004, and 2006; in the 2006 issue, she appeared in a photo wearing a bikini designed by Susan Rosen worth $30 million that was made of diamonds.

In 2004, Sims launched Grayce by Molly Sims, a jewelry line consisting of necklaces, earrings, rings, and bracelets. The collection is available at HSN, Henri Bendel, Scoop, Ron Herman, and Matches London.

Acting 
She has appeared as a hostess for MTV's House of Style (2000–02) and Lifetime's Project Accessory (2011), a spin-off of the series Project Runway. Sims appeared in the music videos for Moby's "We Are All Made of Stars" (2002) and The Lonely Island's "Jizz in My Pants" (2008).

Sims portrayed Delinda Deline in NBC's comedy-drama series Las Vegas (2003–2008), which focused on a team of people working at the fictional Montecito Resort and Casino dealing with issues that arise within the working environment. The series concluded after five seasons on February 15, 2008. Sims had guest roles on several television shows, such as Crossing Jordan, The Twilight Zone, Andy Richter Controls the Universe, Royal Pains, Wedding Band, and Men at Work. She has appeared in several films, such as The Benchwarmers (2006), Yes Man (2008), The Pink Panther 2 (2009), and Fired Up! (2009).

Sims was a contributor on the ABC talk show The View during the 2015–2016 season.

Personal life 
Sims married Netflix executive Scott Stuber on September 24, 2011, at a Napa Valley vineyard. The couple has three children, two sons, Brooks Alan, born on June 19, 2012, Grey Douglas, born on January 10, 2017, and a daughter, Scarlett May, born on March 25, 2015.

Community involvement
Sims appeared on a special edition of Who Wants to Be a Millionaire (1999), and won $125,000 for ovarian cancer research. Sims is a global ambassador for Population Services International's Five & Alive program, which addresses health crises facing children under the age of five and their families. She is also an ambassador for Operation Smile.

Filmography

References

External links

Molly Sims at MTV

1973 births
Female models from Kentucky
American film actresses
American television actresses
Living people
Murray High School (Kentucky) alumni
People from Murray, Kentucky
Actresses from Kentucky
Vanderbilt University alumni
21st-century American actresses